Suavotrochus is a genus of small sea snails, marine gastropod molluscs in the family Solariellidae within the superfamily Trochoidea.

Species
Species within the genus Suavotrochus include:
 Suavotrochus lubricus (Dall, 1881)

References

 
Solariellidae
Gastropod genera